The Clash of the Ash Is an 1987 Irish film written and directed by Fergus Tighe, and starring Liam Heffernan as Phil Kelly, with co-stars Gina Moxley, Vinny Murphy and Alan Devlin. The film is set in the early 1980s and centered around the aspirations of a promising hurler, a popular Gaelic sport in Ireland.

The Clash of the Ash was produced by Circus Films and funded by Bórd Scánnán na hEireann and RTÉ.  It lasts 50 minutes and was shot largely in Fermoy, County Cork. The soundtrack includes The Pogues cover of Ewan McColl's "Dirty Old Town".

Plot
The Irish Film & Television Network describes it as a story in which the central character Phil is "under pressure from his parents who have decided how his life should proceed, [he] refuses to sit his Leaving Cert. and runs off to London to follow his own ambitions."

According to the Irish Examiner, "the basic script would be familiar to frustrated youngsters anywhere in the world, all of them eager to clear out for the bright lights; the difference here is that the frustrated teenager in this case is a talented hurler."

Reception
The Clash of the Ash was critically acclaimed and became a widespread popular success in Ireland. Time Out described it as a "sensitively portrayed slice of provincial life, which manages to tell its yarn with a great deal of humour and compassion."

References

1987 drama films
1987 films
Films set in 1987
Films set in Ireland
Gaelic games films
Irish drama films
English-language Irish films
1980s English-language films
Hurling